Samuel Irvine (born 7 January 1956) is a Scottish former footballer who played as a midfielder in the Football League for Shrewsbury Town and Stoke City.

Career
Irvine was born in Glasgow but started his career at English side Shrewsbury Town where he made 229 league appearances for the club, scoring 19 goals in six seasons. Under the guidance of Alan Durban the "Shrews" gained promotion from the Fourth Division in 1974–75 and were able to establish themselves in the third tier. In January 1978 Alan Durban joined Second Division Stoke City and less than six months later he signed Irvine for £60,000.

His first season with Stoke was full of promise for Irvine as he played well as Stoke finished in 3rd position and gained promotion back to the First Division. In 1979–80 with Stoke playing at the highest level and Irvine's career seemingly improving it came as a shock when in February 1980 he was involved in a near fatal car crash when his Triumph TR7 collided into a tree. His injuries meant that he had to bring an end to his professional football career at the age of 24.

Career statistics

Honours
Shrewsbury Town
 Football League Fourth Division runner-up: 1974–75

Stoke City
 Football League Second Division third-place promotion: 1978–79

References

External links
 

Living people
1956 births
Association football midfielders
English footballers
English Football League players
Shrewsbury Town F.C. players
Stoke City F.C. players